This article has a list of Hindu temples and religious society by different region.

Ontario

Toronto 

 Toronto Kalibari.
 Bangladesh Canada Hindu Cultural Society.
 BAPS Shri Swaminarayan Mandir Toronto
 Shri Swaminarayan Temple.
 Sringeri Temple of Toronto.
 Sri Varasiththi Vinaayagar Hindu Temple.
 Sridurka Hindu Temple.
 Hare Krishna Temple.
 Toronto Thiruchendur Murugan Temple.

Scarborough 

 Hindu Dharmasram
 Sri Radha Krishna Temple.
 Lakshmi Narayan Mandir.
 Vedic Cultural Centre.
 Valmiki Ashram.
 Nithyananda Meditation Academy.
 Vishnu Satsang Mandir.
 International Bhakti Yog Sadhana Society - Sadhana Mandir.
 Bhadra Kali Shakti Mandir.
 The Shirdi Sai Mandir and Cultural Centre.
 Sri Nagapooshani Ambika Sametha Nagalingeswara Swamy Temple.
 Sri Chandramouleeshwara Shivaalayam.
 Periya Sivan Kovil.
 Nainativu Nagammal Kovil of Canada.
 Sri Ayyappa Samajam Of Ontario.
 Canada Sri Shanmuganatha Swamy Hindu Temple.
 Canada Kanthaswamy Temple.
 Thirupathi Venkatachalapathi Temple.
 Merupuram Sri Maha Pathirakali Amman Temple.
 Sri Meenakshi Amman Society.
 Sri Aathi Parashakthi Hindu Temple.

North of Toronto 

 Sanatan Mandir Cultural Centre.
 Hindu Temple Society of Canada.
 Vishnu Mandir.

Mississauga 

 Hindu Heritage Centre.
 Ram Mandir (Mississauga).
 JeyaDurgha Thevasthanam.
 Shri Vitthal Hindu Mandir.
 Sri Siva Satyanarayana Swamy Temple.

Brampton 
  Pashupatinath Temple (Nepalese Canadian Heritage Centre- NCHC)
 Guruvayurappan Temple of Brampton Shri Krishna Temple
 Bharat Mata Mandir.
 Shri Gauri Shankar Mandir.
 Shiva Ganesh Mandir.
 Shiv Shakti Gyaan Cultural Sabha.
 Jagannath Temple.
 Bhavani Shankar Mandir & Cultural Centre.
 Sri Ganesha Durga Hindu Temple.
 Sri Sivasubramaniya Hindu Temple.
 Sri Katpaga Vinayagar Hindu Temple.
 Canada Sri Sabari Peedam.

Halton 
 Vaishno Devi Temple, Oakville
 ISKCON Milton

Beyond Greater Toronto 

 Niagara Hindu Samaj Shiv Mandir (Niagara Falls, Ontario).
 Brantford Hindu Temple (Brantford).
 Hindu Mandir Durham.
 Devi Mandir.
 Canada sri ambalavana vetha vinayagar alayam.
 Hindu Temple of Ottawa-Carleton.
 Vishva Shakti Durga Mandir Association.
 ISKCON Ottawa.
 Sri Sathya Sai Baba Centre of Ottawa - Carleton.

Maritimes 

 Vedanta Ashram Society (Halifax, Nova Scotia).
 St. John's Hindu Temple (St. John's, Newfoundland & Labrador).
 Maritime Geeta Bhawan (Fredericton, New Brunswick)

Quebec 

Montreal

 Temple Shree Ramji Mandhata (Montreal, Quebec)
 Montreal Thiru Murugan Temple. (Montreal, Quebec)
 The Hindu Temple of Quebec (Dollard des Ormeaux, Quebec)
 Hindu Mission Of Canada Temple. (Montreal, Quebec)
 ISKCON (International Society for Krishna Conciousness) Temple. (Montreal, Quebec)
 Montreal Arya Samaj. (Montreal, Quebec)
 Subramanya/Ayyappa Temple. (Val Morin, Quebec)

Manitoba 

 Hindu Temple and Dr. Raj Pandey Hindu Centre (Winnipeg, Manitoba).
 Hindu Temple and Cultural Centre (Winnipeg, Manitoba).

Saskatchewan 

 Shri Lakshmi Narayan Temple - Hindu Society Of Saskatchewan (Saskatoon, Saskatchewan).
 Shree Hindu Swaminarayan Temple (ISSO) (Saskatoon, Saskatchewan).

Alberta 

Edmonton
 Fiji Sanatan Society of Alberta (Edmonton, Alberta).
 ISKCON Sri Sri Radha Govindagi Mandir (Edmonton, Alberta).
 Bhartiya Cultural Society of Alberta (Edmonton, Alberta).

Calgary
 Hindu Society of Calgary (Calgary, Alberta).

British Columbia 

Greater Vancouver Area

 ISKCON Vancouver (Burnaby, British Columbia).
 Lakshmi Narayan Mandir (Surrey, British Columbia).
 Sri Ganesh Temple Society of BC (Vancouver, British Columbia).
 Hindu Temple Burnaby (Burnaby, British Columbia).

Outside of Vancouver or the Lower Mainland

 Victoria Hindu Parishad and Cultural Centre (Victoria, British Columbia).
 South Okanagan Hindu Temple (Summerland, British Columbia).

See also 

 Hinduism in Canada
 List of Hindu temples outside India

References

External links 

Hindu temples by country
Hinduism in Canada
Hindu temples in Canada
Canada
Hindu temples